Progress M-34 was a Russian uncrewed cargo spacecraft which was launched in 1997 to resupply the Mir space station, and which subsequently collided with Mir during a docking attempt, resulting in significant damage to the space station.

Spacecraft
The 52nd of 64 Progress spacecraft to visit Mir, it used the Progress-M 11F615A55 configuration, and had the serial number 234. It carried supplies including food, water, and oxygen for the EO-23 crew aboard Mir, as well as equipment for conducting scientific research, and fuel for adjusting the station's orbit and performing maneuvers. Among its cargo were two new spacesuits, three fire extinguishers, oxygen candles, and equipment to facilitate repairs to Mir's life support system.

Launch and docking
Progress M-34 was launched at 16:04:05 UTC on 6 April 1997, atop a Soyuz-U carrier rocket flying from Site 1/5 at the Baikonur Cosmodrome. Following two days of free flight, it docked with the Aft port of Mir's Kvant-1 module at 17:30:01 GMT on 8 April.

Collision
Progress M-34 undocked from Mir at 10:22:45 UTC on 24 June 1997, in preparation for a docking test planned for the next day. On 25 June 1997, the spacecraft re-approached Mir under manual control (TORU), in a test intended to establish whether Russia could reduce the cost of Progress missions by eliminating the Kurs automated docking system. At 09:18 UTC, whilst under the control of Vasily Tsibliyev, the Progress spacecraft collided with the space station's Spektr module, damaging both the module itself, and a solar panel. Following the collision, Progress M-34 was manoeuvred away from the station, before being deorbited on 2 July. Its deorbit burn was conducted at 05:34:58 UTC, with the spacecraft being destroyed during reentry over the Pacific Ocean at 06:31:50.

See also

1997 in spaceflight
List of Progress flights
List of uncrewed spaceflights to Mir

References

External links 
Collision in orbit

Spacecraft launched in 1997
Progress (spacecraft) missions
Spacecraft which reentered in 1997
Satellite collisions
Spacecraft launched by Soyuz-U rockets